Ayşe Gökçen Denkel (born 2 August 1985, in Istanbul) is a Turkish volleyball player. She is 193 cm tall and plays as a middle blocker.

Gökçen Denkel plays for Nilüfer Belediyespor. She has played for Eczacıbaşı VitrA since she was 11 years old at both youth and senior level and also played for G.S. Medical Park and Fenerbahçe.

Awards

Club
 2011-12 Turkish Cup -  Runner-up, with Galatasaray Daikin
 2011-12 CEV Cup -  Runner-Up, with Galatasaray Daikin
 2012-13 CEV Cup -  Runner-Up, with Fenerbahçe
 2013-14 CEV Cup -  Champion, with Fenerbahçe
 2014–15 Turkish Women's Volleyball League -  Champion, with Fenerbahçe Grundig

See also
 Turkish women in sports

External links
 Galatasaray Medical Park Website
 Ayse Gokcen Denkel Zop at the International Volleyball Federation
 
 
 Ayse Gökçen Denkel Zop at WorldofVolley
 Ayşe Gökçen Denkel at Volleybox.net

1985 births
Living people
Volleyball players from Istanbul
Turkish women's volleyball players
Galatasaray S.K. (women's volleyball) players
Eczacıbaşı volleyball players
Fenerbahçe volleyballers
Mediterranean Games medalists in volleyball
Mediterranean Games silver medalists for Turkey
Competitors at the 2009 Mediterranean Games
21st-century Turkish sportswomen